Harry DeMiller  (November 12, 1867 – October 19, 1928), was a professional baseball player who played pitcher in the Major Leagues for the 1892 Chicago Colts.

External links

1867 births
1928 deaths
Major League Baseball pitchers
Chicago Colts players
19th-century baseball players
Baseball players from Ohio